Hexafluorothioacetone is an organic perfluoro thione compound with formula CF3CSCF3. At standard conditions it is a blue gas.

Production
Hexafluorothioacetone was first produced by Middleton in 1961 by boiling bis-(perfluoroisopropyl)mercury with sulfur.

Properties
Hexafluorothioacetone boils at 8 °C. Below this it is a blue liquid.

Colour
The blue colour is due to absorption in the visible light range with bands at 800–675 nm and 725–400 nm. These bands are due to T1–S0 and S1–S0 transitions. There is also a strong absorption in ultraviolet around 230-190 nm.

Reactions
Hexafluorothioacetone acts more like a true thiocarbonyl (C=S) than many other thiocarbonyl compounds, because it is not able to form thioenol compounds (=C-S-H), and the sulfur is not in a negative ionized state (C-S−).
Hexafluorothioacetone is not attacked by water or oxygen at standard conditions as are many other thiocarbonyls.

Bases trigger the formation of a dimer 2,2,4,4-tetrakis-(trifluoromethyl)-1,3-dithietane. Bases includes amines.

The dimer can be heated to regenerate the hexafluorothioacetone monomer.

The dimer is also produced in a reaction with hexafluoropropene and sulfur with some potassium fluoride.

Hexafluorothioacetone reacts with bisulfite to form a Bunte salt CH(CF3)2SSO2−.

Mercaptans reacting with hexafluorothioacetone yield disulfides or a thiohemiketal:

R-SH + C(CF3)2S → R-S-S-CH(CF3)2.

R-SH + C(CF3)2S → RSC(CF3)2SH (for example in methyl mercaptan or ethyl mercaptan).

With mercaptoacetic acid, instead of a thiohemiketal, water elimination yields a ring shaped molecule called a dithiolanone -CH2C(O)SC(CF3)2S- (2,2-di(trifluoromethyl)-1,3-dithiolan-4-one).
Aqueous hydrogen chloride results in the formation of a dimeric disulfide CH(CF3)2SSC(CF3)2Cl. Hydrogen bromide with water yields the similar CH(CF3)2SSC(CF3)2Br. Dry hydrogen iodide does something different and reduces the sulfur making CH(CF3)2SH. Wet hydrogen iodide only reduces to a disulfide CH(CF3)2SSC(CF3)2H. Strong organic acids add water to yield a disulfide compound CH(CF3)2SSC(CF3)2OH.

Chlorine and bromine add to hexafluorothioacetone to make CCl(CF3)2SCl and CBr(CF3)2SBr.

With diazomethane hexafluorothioacetone produces 2,2,5,5-tetrakis(trifluoromethyl)-l,3-dithiolane, another substituted dithiolane. Diphenyldiazoniethane reacts to form a three membered ring called a thiirane (di-2,2-trifluoromethyl-di-3,3-phenyl-thiirane)

Trialkylphosphites (P(OR)3) react to make a trialkoxybis(trifluoromethyl)methylenephosphorane (RO)3P=C(CF3)2 and a thiophosphite (RO)3PS.

Hexafluorothioacetone can act as a ligand on nickel.

Hexafluorothioacetone is highly reactive to alkenes and dienes combining via addition reactions. With butadiene it reacts even as low as -78 °C to yield  2,2-bis-(trifluoromethyl)-3,6-dihydro-2H-l-thiapyran.

See also
Hexafluoroacetone

References

External links

Thioketones
Perfluorinated compounds
Trifluoromethyl compounds
Gases with color